Kokomo is a census-designated place and unincorporated community in Marion County, Mississippi.

It was first named as a CDP in the 2020 Census which listed a population of 150.

Establishment 
Kokomo was named after the city of Kokomo, Indiana.

Kokomo was organized by the Phillip Enoch family of Fernwood, Mississippi, circa 1912. They planned to purchase timber to finance the existing Fernwood railroad that the family was purchasing. After they had secured a right-of-way, the Enochs began to construct and lay the track east of Tylertown. The first tracks were made of wood, but were later replaced with metal. When the tracks crossed a public road, they would give the crossing a name. The names came in the following order: Davo; Barto; Carto; Knoxo; and Kokomo.

Commerce 
While in Kokomo, the Enochs set up a turpentine distillery, the largest in the United States at that time.  There were blacksmith shops, café, barbershop, grocery stores, gristmills, and a drug store.

Demographics

2020 census

Note: the US Census treats Hispanic/Latino as an ethnic category. This table excludes Latinos from the racial categories and assigns them to a separate category. Hispanics/Latinos can be of any race.

Education 
The first school at Kokomo was the Old China Grove School.  This was a one-room, cotton-house-style building that was used from 1904 until 1912 - school terms lasted about six months each year.  The logging camp moved in 1912, and so a new school building was erected at the new location in Kokomo.  The first Kokomo Baptist Church was used for the school until the new school building could be constructed. In 1935 when the logging camp had moved out of Kokomo and most of the population with it, Kokomo became a small town.

Churches 
The Baptist Church was organized on September 12, 1911. The church building was constructed shortly after this time with the lumber being donated by Mack Williamson and Henry Bourne. Joe Morris donated the pews for the church. This church stood just across the road and a few yards south of where the Kokomo United Methodist Church stands today. In 1959, when the Kokomo School closed, the Baptist Church bought the school building. This old school building was used until 2001 for the Kokomo Baptist Church.

In 2001 the Baptist Church moved into a newly constructed building at the same location. The Kokomo Methodist Church was organized in 1910. Before being organized they had started worshipping in 1906 under the leadership of J. E. Williamson. Later from 1907 to 1909 W. B. Waldrop led the worshippers. In 1910 the worship leader was T. H. King and in 1911 it was D. Scarborough. Dr. Henry Lewis Carruth was one of the people of Kokomo who met in October 1911 to organize Kokomo Methodist Church. Early settlers of the community included the Jarrell, Simmons, Hansford Rowley & Fred Rowley families, Packwood, Toney, Summers, Lee, Conerly, Foil and Reagan families.

References

Unincorporated communities in Marion County, Mississippi
Census-designated places in Marion County, Mississippi
1912 establishments in Mississippi
Unincorporated communities in Mississippi
Mississippi placenames of Native American origin